Jimmy Raney featuring Bob Brookmeyer  is an album by jazz guitarist Jimmy Raney and trombonist Bob Brookmeyer which was recorded in 1956 for the ABC-Paramount label.

Reception 

AllMusic gave the album 3½ stars and its review by Thom Jurek states, "This is as fine a set from the end of the cool jazz period as one is likely to hear."

Track listing

Personnel 
 Jimmy Raney – guitar
 Bob Brookmeyer – valve trombone
 Hank Jones – piano (tracks 3, 4, 7 & 8)
 Dick Katz – piano (tracks 1, 2, 5, & 6)
 Teddy Kotick – double bass
 Osie Johnson – drums

References 

1956 albums
Jimmy Raney albums
Bob Brookmeyer albums
ABC Records albums
Albums produced by Creed Taylor